Sarab-e Shian (also Romanized as Sarāb-e Shīān) is a village in Shiyan Rural District, in the Central District of Eslamabad-e Gharb County, Kermanshah Province, Iran. At the 2006 census, its population was 496, in 104 families.

References 

Populated places in Eslamabad-e Gharb County